Mira Lobe (born Hilde Mirjam Rosenthal; September 17, 1913, in Görlitz, Silesia – February 6, 1995, in Vienna) was an Austrian writer of more than 100 children's books.

Some of her books were translated into English and other languages, such as Es ging ein Schneemann durch das Land, which became The Snowman Who Went for a Walk in English. The television series Children's Island (1984) was based on one of her novels.

Life 
After school, Mira Lobe wanted to study art history and German language and literature, but because she was Jewish, Lobe was not allowed due to the growing antisemitism. Instead she attended a fashion school in Berlin, joined a Zionist youth group and studied Hebrew.

In 1936, she emigrated to Mandate Palestine, where in 1940 she married the actor and director Friedrich Lobe. The couple had two children. Her first book, Insu-Pu, was published in 1948 in Tel Aviv. It tells the story of eleven children on their way to Terrania, where there is peace. They become stranded on a desert island where they manage to establish a perfectly working state.

In 1951, she moved to Vienna with her husband. There she published books in first a communist and later a socialist publishing house. In 1957 they moved to East Berlin.

Works (incomplete) 
In all of Mira Lobe's books, peace, tolerance and social awareness are important topics. Many of them were illustrated by Susi Weigel.

Translated to English 
 The Zoo Breaks Out (1958)
 Johnny and the Boople (1963)
 The Grandma in the Apple Tree (1970)
 Hoppelpop! (1977)
 Hocus-Pocus (1979)
 Let Me Out! Said the Mouse (1980)
 Not What You Think (1980)
 Valerie and the Good-Night Swing (1982)
 Pig in a Muddle (1983)
 The Castle Ghost (1984)
 The Snowman Who Went for a Walk (1984)
 Ben and the Child of the Forest (1988)
 I Am Me (1989)
 Christoph Wants a Party (1995)
 Bimbulli (1996)

References

External links 
 
 
 Internationales Symposium Mira Lobe
 List of works

Jewish German writers
German-language writers
Austrian children's writers
Austrian women children's writers
Austrian people of German descent
Austrian emigrants to Israel
Austrian Jews
People from Görlitz
1913 births
1995 deaths